Richard A. Dixon  is distinguished research professor at the University of North Texas, a faculty fellow of the Hagler Institute of Advanced Study and Timothy C. Hall-Heep distinguished faculty chair at Texas A&M University.

Education
Dixon studied Biochemistry at the University of Oxford where he was awarded a Bachelor of Arts degree in 1973 followed by a Doctor of Philosophy degree in 1976 for research on the production of Phytoalexin by plant tissue cultures.

Career and research
After his DPhil, Dixon was a postdoctoral researcher at the University of Cambridge before starting his own research group at Royal Holloway College at the University of London. He served as Director of the Plant Biology Division at the Samuel Roberts Noble Foundation in Ardmore, Oklahoma from 1998 to 2013. For over 30 years he has been a world leader in the field of plant specialized metabolism, using multidisciplinary approaches to decipher the biosynthetic and regulatory pathways leading to lignin and bioactive flavonoids, and driving the field of metabolic engineering for development of more nutritious forages and bioenergy crops with enhanced traits for biorefining. His papers have been cited over 66,000 times.

From January 1st 2023 he has been Editor-in-Chief of Philosophical Transactions of the Royal Society B and he is also a member of the Editorial Board for PNAS.

Awards and honours
Dixon was elected a member of the National Academy of Sciences (NAS) of the United States. He is also a Fellow of the American Association for the Advancement of Science, the National Academy of Inventors and the American Society of Plant Biologists (ASPB). He was elected a Fellow of the Royal Society (FRS) in 2018.

Dixon has been recognized as a Pioneer Member of the American Society of Plant Biologists.

References

Living people
Fellows of the Royal Society
Members of the United States National Academy of Sciences
Year of birth missing (living people)